Roman Scandals is a 1933 American black-and-white pre-Code musical film starring Eddie Cantor, Ruth Etting, Gloria Stuart, Edward Arnold and David Manners. It was directed by Frank Tuttle. The film features a number of intricate production numbers choreographed by Busby Berkeley. The song "Keep Young and Beautiful" is from this film. In addition to the starring actors in the picture, the elaborate dance numbers are performed by the "Goldwyn Girls" (who in this film include future stars such as Lucille Ball, Paulette Goddard and Barbara Pepper). The title of the film is a pun on Roman sandals.

Plot summary
Easily the best of Eddie Cantor's gargantuan musical comedies, Roman Scandals begins in the middle-America community of West Rome, Oklahoma, where Eddie (Cantor) is employed as a delivery boy.

A self-styled authority of Ancient Roman history, Eddie bemoans the fact that the local shanty community is about to be wiped out by scheming politicians, certain that such an outrage could never have happened during Rome's Golden Days.

After a blow to the head, Eddie wakes up in Imperial Rome, where he is sold on the slave auction block to good-natured tribune Josephus (David Manners). Eddie soon discovers that the evil emperor Valerius (Edward Arnold) is every bit a crook and grafter as the politicians in West Rome, and he intends to do something about it.

He gets a job as food taster for Valerius—a none-too-secure position, inasmuch as the emperor's wife, Agrippa (Veree Teasdale), is constantly trying to poison him—and does his best to smooth the path of romance for Josephus and recently captured princess Sylvia (Gloria Stuart). Eddie's well-intentioned interference earns him a session in the torture chamber, but he escapes and commandeers a chariot.

On the verge of capture, Eddie wakes to find himself in West Rome, OK again, where he quickly foils the modern-day despots and brings about a happy ending for all his friends.

Cast list
 Eddie Cantor as Eddie/Oedipus  
 The Goldwyn Girls as Slave Girls  
 Ruth Etting as Olga  
 Gloria Stuart as Princess Sylvia  
 Edward Arnold as Emperor Valerius  
 David Manners as Josephus  
 Verree Teasdale as Empress Agrippa  
 Alan Mowbray as Majordomo  
 Jack Rutherford as Manius 
 Willard Robertson as Warren Finley Cooper  
 Lee Kohlmar as Storekeeper  
 Harry Cording as Soldier (uncredited)
 Francis Ford as Citizen (uncredited) 
 Murdock MacQuarrie as Senator (uncredited)

Soundtrack

 "Build a Little Home"
Music by Harry Warren
Lyrics by Al Dubin
Performed by Eddie Cantor and chorus
Reprised by Eddie Cantor and chorus
 "No More Love"
Music by Harry Warren
Lyrics by Al Dubin
Sung by Ruth Etting
Danced by chorus
 "Keep Young and Beautiful"
Music by Harry Warren
Lyrics by Al Dubin
Performed by Eddie Cantor with chorus
Danced by chorus
 "Put a Tax on Love"
Music by Harry Warren
Lyrics by Al Dubin
Sung by Eddie Cantor
 "All of Me"
Music by Gerald Marks
Lyrics by Seymour Simons
Sung by Eddie Cantor
 "Dinah"
Music by Harry Akst
Lyrics by Sam Lewis and Joe Young
Sung by Eddie Cantor
 "Kickin' the Gong Around"
Music by Harold Arlen
Lyrics by Ted Koehler
Sung by Eddie Cantor
 "Turkey in the Straw"
Traditional
Played in the opening scene

Critical response
A written media review is located in Monthly Film Bulletin (UK), Vol. 1, Iss. 8, September 1934, (MG)

Reception
The film was one of United Artists' most popular films of the year.

See also
 List of American films of 1933

References

External links

 
 
 

1933 films
1933 musical films
American black-and-white films
1930s English-language films
Films scored by Alfred Newman
Films directed by Frank Tuttle
Films set in the Roman Empire
Films set in the 3rd century
Films set in the 4th century
Samuel Goldwyn Productions films
United Artists films
American musical films
1930s American films